Bibiche Kabamba (born 15 July 1981) is a Congolese handball player. She plays for the club Héritage Kinshasa and on the DR Congo national team. She represented DR Congo at the 2013 World Women's Handball Championship in Serbia, where DR Congo placed 20th.

References

1981 births
Living people
Democratic Republic of the Congo female handball players
21st-century Democratic Republic of the Congo people